Phillip Vosloo (born 18 May 1971) is a South African cricket umpire. He has stood in matches in the Sunfoil 3-Day Cup tournament.

References

External links
 

1971 births
Living people
South African cricket umpires
Place of birth missing (living people)